Cyptasia or Kyptasia was a town on the Black Sea coast of ancient Paphlagonia. The name appears as Cloptasa in the Tabula Peutingeriana was 7 Roman miles from Sinope on the road to Amisus.

It is located near Eren Boğazı in Asiatic Turkey.

References

Populated places in ancient Paphlagonia
Former populated places in Turkey
History of Sinop Province